Arild Peter Haaland (13 December 1919 – 24 January 2012) was a Norwegian philosopher, literary historian, translator and non-fiction writer. He was born in Bergen. His thesis from 1956 was an analysis of the Nazism in Germany. He was decorated Knight, First Class of the Order of St. Olav in 1979. He received the Fritt Ord Award in 1992. Haaland was portrayed by sculptor Arnold Haukeland, and by the painters Odd Nerdrum and Karl Erik Harr.

Selected works
 (thesis)
 (dr. thesis)

References

1919 births
2012 deaths
Norwegian philosophers
Academic staff of the University of Bergen
Academic staff of the University of Tromsø